The officious bystander is a metaphorical figure of English law and legal fiction, developed by MacKinnon LJ in Southern Foundries (1926) Ltd v Shirlaw to assist in determining when a term should be implied into an agreement. While the officious bystander test is not the overriding formulation in English law today, it provides a useful guide. The suggested approach is to imagine a nosey, officious bystander walking past two contracting parties and asking them whether they would want to put some express term into the agreement. If the parties would instantly retort that such a term is "of course" already mutually part of the agreement then it is apt for implication.

Overview
In Southern Foundries (1926) Ltd v Shirlaw MacKinnon LJ wrote,

The test is outdated to the extent that it suggested implication was a process dependent on what contracting parties would have subjectively intended. The main problem is that people would often disagree, or one side's bargaining power would be such that they could ignore the intentions of the other party. The rule now is that terms are implied to reflect the parties' reasonable expectations as a broader part of the process of objective, contextual construction. In AG of Belize v Belize Telecom Ltd, Lord Hoffmann wrote the following:

M&S v BNP Paribas (2015) confirmed that the officious bystander test remained one of necessity, not reasonableness.

See also
English contract law
UK company law

Notes

English contract law